A Little Bit of Fluff (or Skirts in the U.S.), is a 1928 British silent comedy film directed by Wheeler Dryden and Jess Robbins and starring Sydney Chaplin, Betty Balfour and Edmund Breon.

Synopsis
The misadventures of a young newly-wed man (Chaplin) and an exotic dancer (Balfour), the titular "little bit of fluff."  Tully (Chaplin), an effete and completely mother-in-law-dominated new husband becomes unwittingly involved in boxer Hudson's plot to wrest his girlfriend's (Balfour's) $5000 necklace from her in order to pay his gambling debts.  Living next door to Maggie, the exotic dancer, Tully is first introduced to her only because his mother-in-law demands that he go next door and make the noise cease—noise from one of Maggie's hedonist parties.

That evening, purely by coincidence, Tully accompanies his other neighbor, John Ayres, to the club at which Maggie performs as a singer/dancer (The Little Bit of Fluff), his wife and MIL having left town to visit aunty.  It is at this club that Tully accidentally acquires the necklace and so, the rest of the farce is taken up with scenes of mistaken identities, moments of being in the wrong places at the wrong times, misunderstandings with wives, stepmothers, and boxer boyfriends, etc.

In the end, Hudson is arrested for trying to steal the necklace back from Tully's apartment and all falls back into order—except that Tully has NOT managed to lose his mother-in-law along the way.  This film is highlighted by intricate gags, including using a pekinese puppy to moisten stamps, a fantastic spinning headstand by Chaplin, and, perhaps, marred a bit by a lack of plot and an unbearably long scene at the nightclub in which Chaplin mistakes a female "little person" for a little girl.  This film definitely follows along well from the sort of character Chaplin created in his Warner Brothers contract—a winning one for him.

Cast
Sydney Chaplin: Bertram Tully
Betty Balfour: Mamie Scott
Edmund Breon: John Ayres
Nancy Rigg: Violet Tully
Clifford McLaglen: Henry Hudson
Annie Esmond: Aunt Agatha
Enid Stamp-Taylor: Susie West
Cameron Carr: Fred Carter
Haddon Mason: The Wasp
Harry McCoy		
Dorothy Bartlam: Bit role (uncredited)
John Thomas Hall: The Vicar

Production
The film is based on the long running farce of the same title by Walter W. Ellis, which premiered at the Criterion Theatre, London, on 27 October 1915, featuring Ernest Thesiger as Bertram Tully.

This film version was predated by a 1919 film A Little Bit of Fluff directed by Kenelm Foss. In that adaptation, Thesiger reprised his role as Tully, as did Alfred Drayton (Dr. Bigland) and Stanley Lathbury (Nixon Trippett). This 1928 film features Syd Chaplin, the half-brother of both Charlie Chaplin and director Wheeler Dryden, as Tully. It was Chaplin's final film.

References

External links

Sydchaplin.com

Films directed by Wheeler Dryden
1928 films
British black-and-white films
1928 comedy films
British comedy films
British silent feature films
Films shot at British International Pictures Studios
1920s British films
Silent comedy films